Garigliano Nuclear Power Plant was a nuclear power plant located at Sessa Aurunca (Campania), in southern Italy. It was named after the river Garigliano.

Consisting of one 150MWe BWR from General Electric, it operated from 1964 until 1982. First criticality was on 5 June 1963, with grid connection 1 January 1964 and full commercial operation from 1 June in that year. Garigliano was in 1964 the fourth BWR ever worldwide commercial operated, and had the second highest MW-capacity after Dresden Nuclear Power Plant unit 1.

Final shutdown was on 1 March 1982 and the plant was handed to the Italian nuclear decommissioning authority SOGIN on 1 November 1999. Decommissioning is expected to take 27 years, with the total bill expected to reach $432.4 million.

External links

 Nuclear power in Italy  at the WNA site.
 Nuclear power profile of Italy at the NEA site.

References

Nuclear power stations using boiling water reactors
Former nuclear power stations in Italy
1964 establishments in Italy
1982 disestablishments in Italy